Atlas is a superhero and antihero appearing an American comic books published by DC Comics. It debuted in 1st Issue Special #1 (April 1975) and was created by Jack Kirby.

Publication history
The first Golden Age version of a character named Atlas in DC Comics appeared in Action Comics #121 (June 1948). The second appearance of an Atlas was in Action Comics #320 (January 1965). The third was in Action Comics #353 (August 1967).

The Jack Kirby Atlas' first and only appearance prior to Superman #677 was in 1st Issue Special #1. James Robinson brought Atlas back in Superman #678. According to Robinson, Atlas is going to save humanity: "The way I like to look at him is like in the Marvel Universe, Namor is a hero but he really skates the fine line between being a hero and a villain, but he stays on the side of the hero. Atlas, skates that line between hero and villain but he ultimately always falls on the villain side". He continued to say that Atlas will become a major player in the Superman mythos moving forward and there will be some real twists to the character.

One of the earlier characters named Atlas re-appeared in Grant Morrison's All-Star Superman, where a version of Atlas appears in issue #3. This Atlas is more closely based on the mythological figure of Atlas and competes with Superman and Samson to "win" Lois Lane, similar to the story in Action Comics #320 from January 1965.

Fictional character biography
The Jack Kirby Atlas' family and people were slain by the raiders of Hyssa the Lizard King. Atlas was raised by a wise and mysterious traveller named Chagra. Because of an alien crystal carried by Atlas, Chagra theorized that Atlas was one of the people of the Crystal Mountain. Chagra agrees to help Atlas achieve his revenge, but only if Atlas leads him to the Crystal Mountain. Atlas grew up to become a protector of the innocent, but once King Hyssa was defeated, his petulance and darker nature came to the forefront.

Atlas returns in Superman #677 as part of The Coming of Atlas storyline and his origin is retold in issue #678 where he is seen saving citizens of Metropolis he himself had endangered. He is currently working with a secret government project that intends to kill Superman. Atlas wants to defeat Superman and replace him as Metropolis' champion on his way to conquer the modern world. He fights the Science Police and Superman. He holds the upper hand on Superman for most of the battle, but is interfered with by his dog Krypto, who seems to be powered by magic. Atlas eventually defeats Krypto and prepares to kill him only for Superman to re-enter the fight and defeat him with some magical enhancement from Zachary Zatara.
Atlas' return and fight with Superman was described as part of a ruse intended to test Project 7734, a governmental project that utilizes magic in an effort to kill Superman, who is vulnerable to magic. Atlas continues to work for this project.

Atlas is later kidnapped and brainwashed into fighting the Justice League by an unknown party. After being defeated by the team, Atlas explains to Batman that he has no idea who captured him in the first place.

Other versions

Kingdom Come
 A character resembling Atlas appeared in Kingdom Come #2 (May 1996). This version of Atlas, was included in the series, wherein he is described as a "legendary demigod figure".

In other media

Films
 Atlas appears in All-Star Superman, voiced by Steve Blum.

Television 
 A character based on Atlas appears in the Teen Titans episode "Only Human", voiced by Keith David. This version is a robot.

See also
 List of Superman enemies

References

External links
 DCU Guide: Atlas 
 Comicvine: Atlas
 CBR: James Robinson Interview

DC Comics male superheroes
DC Comics male supervillains
Comics characters introduced in 1975
Fantasy comics
DC Comics characters with superhuman strength
Fictional kings
Characters created by Jack Kirby
Articles about multiple fictional characters